Mobarakeh (also Romanized as Mobārakeh) is a village in Mahmudabad-e Seyyed Rural District, in the Central District of Sirjan County, Kerman Province, Iran. At the 2006 census, its population was 210, in 48 families.

References 

Populated places in Sirjan County